Queensport may refer to:

Australia 

 Queensport, Queensland
 Queensport Aquarium

Canada 

 Queensport, Nova Scotia